Karimabad (also Romanized as Karīmābād) is a village in Kermajan Rural District, in the Central District of Kangavar County, Kermanshah Province, Iran. At the 2006 census, its population was 114, in 22 families.

References 

Populated places in Kangavar County